Kener Luis Arce Caicedo (born 17 June 1988) is an Ecuadorian  professional footballer who plays for Ecuadorian Serie A side Cumbayá F.C. as a midfielder.

References

External links
 

1988 births
Living people
Ecuadorian footballers
C.D. ESPOLI footballers
C.D. Olmedo footballers
L.D.U. Loja footballers
Fuerza Amarilla S.C. footballers
C.S.D. Independiente del Valle footballers
C.S.D. Macará footballers
C.D. Cuenca footballers
Ecuadorian Serie A players
People from San Lorenzo, Ecuador
Association football midfielders